Liu Sitong (born 25 July 1994) is a Chinese para-alpine skier.

Career
She represented China at the 2018 Winter Paralympics held in Pyeongchang, South Korea. She competed in the women's slalom and women's giant slalom events.

She represented China at the 2022 Winter Paralympics held in Beijing, China and won four medals, silver in the giant slalom, and bronze in women's downhill, slalom and super combined sitting events.

References 

Living people
1994 births
Place of birth missing (living people)
Chinese female alpine skiers
Alpine skiers at the 2018 Winter Paralympics
Alpine skiers at the 2022 Winter Paralympics
Medalists at the 2022 Winter Paralympics
Paralympic silver medalists for China
Paralympic bronze medalists for China
Paralympic medalists in alpine skiing
21st-century Chinese women